Asa Fitch (February 24, 1809 – April 8, 1879) was a natural historian and entomologist from Salem, New York.

His early studies were of both natural history and medicine, which he studied at the newly formed Rensselaer Polytechnic Institute, graduating in 1827.  However, in 1838 he decided to start studying agriculture and entomology. In 1838 he began to collect and study insects for New York state. In 1854 he became the first professional entomologist of New York State Agricultural Society (commissioned by the State of New York). This made him the first occupational entomologist in the United States.

His vast studies of many insects helped scientists to solve some of the problems of crop damage caused by insects. Many of his notebooks are now the property of the Smithsonian Institution. Fitch also discovered the rodent botfly Cuterebra emasculator in 1856. He died April 8, 1879, in Salem, New York.

The Martin–Fitch House and Asa Fitch Jr. Laboratory was added to the National Register of Historic Places in 2014.

Further reading

References

External links 
Asa Fitch Notebooks, circa 1827,1872 from the Smithsonian Institution Archives
Salem New York Historical Site 
RPI Alumni Hall of Fame
Asa Fitch papers (MS 215). Manuscripts and Archives, Yale University Library. 

1809 births
1879 deaths
American entomologists
Rensselaer Polytechnic Institute alumni
Zoologists with author abbreviations
People from Salem, New York
Scientists from New York (state)